The Team Fishing Harbour is a harbour where fishing boats are tied up in Tema in the Greater Accra Region of Ghana. It along with the Albert Bosomtwi-Sam Fishing Harbour are the only two fishing harbours in Ghana. It is operated by the Ghana Ports and Harbours Authority.

References

Fishing communities in Ghana
Greater Accra Region
Ports and harbours of Ghana